The 50th Massachusetts General Court, consisting of the Massachusetts Senate and the Massachusetts House of Representatives, met in 1829 during the governorship of Levi Lincoln Jr. Sherman Leland served as president of the Senate and William B. Calhoun served as speaker of the House.

Senators

Representatives

See also
 20th United States Congress
 21st United States Congress
 List of Massachusetts General Courts

References

External links
 
 
 
 

Political history of Massachusetts
Massachusetts legislative sessions
massachusetts
1828 in Massachusetts
massachusetts
1829 in Massachusetts